A miniature is a small bottle of a spirit, liqueur or other alcoholic beverage. Their contents, typically 50 ml, are intended to comprise an individual serving.

Miniatures may be used as gifts, samples, or for promotional purposes. In Scotland and the Northeastern United States they are often known as nips and shooters, and referred elsewhere as airplane bottles or mini-bar bottles or travel-sized bottles. They are sometimes available in hotel mini-bars, on trains,  and planes, and in other circumstances where serving from a full size bottle is impractical or uneconomical. They are sometimes sold in sets, allowing the comparative tasting of different types of beverage. They are also sold in gift sets with a corresponding drinking glass.

Miniatures are collected by some people, with various clubs and societies serving the hobby.

References 

Alcoholic drinks
Bottles
Collecting
Alcohol measurement